Black snapper is a common name for a fish.

Black snapper may refer to:

 Apsilus dentatus, a member of the snapper fish family 
 Lutjanus griseus, the snapper fish family found in the coastal waters of the western Atlantic Ocean
 Sistrurus catenatus, a venomous pit viper found mostly in the United States
 Girella tricuspidata a fish from New Zealand